Ponizovka is a rural locality (a khutor) in Glebovsky Selsoviet Rural Settlement, Fatezhsky District, Kursk Oblast, Russia. The population as of 2010 is 14.

Geography 
The khutor is located on the Shmarny Brook (a link tributary of the Usozha in the basin of the Svapa), 111 km from the Russia–Ukraine border, 40 km north-west of Kursk, 7 km south-east of the district center – the town Fatezh, 1 km from the selsoviet center – Zykovka.

Climate
Ponizovka has a warm-summer humid continental climate (Dfb in the Köppen climate classification).

Transport 
Ponizovka is located 7 km from the federal route  Crimea Highway as part of the European route E105, 21 km from the road of regional importance  (Kursk – Ponyri), 6 km from the road  (Fatezh – 38K-018), 1 km from the road of intermunicipal significance  (M2 "Crimea Highway" – Zykovka – Maloye Annenkovo – 38K-039), 23 km from the nearest railway halt 487 km (railway line Oryol – Kursk).

The rural locality is situated 41 km from Kursk Vostochny Airport, 164 km from Belgorod International Airport and 225 km from Voronezh Peter the Great Airport.

References

Notes

Sources

Rural localities in Fatezhsky District